The 2021–22 season was the  Mohammedan SC's 86th season in existence and 14th consecutive season in Bangladesh Premier League since the league's establishment in 2007. In addition to domestic league, Dhaka Mohammedan SC are participated on this season's edition of Federation Cup and Independence Cup. This season was covered period from 1 October 2021 to 2 August 2022.

Season summary

November
On 28 November Dhaka Mohammedan begun their season with winning 2–1 goals versus Muktijoddha Sangsad KC. Scored by Souleymane Diabate and Sahed Hossain confirmed their win.

December
On 2 December Dhaka Mohammedan played second match of the group against Bangladesh Army Football Team they have lost by 2–1 goals. Early goal by Ranju Shikdar and second half time scored by Shahriar Emon confirmed their win. At the end extra time a goal by Minhaj Abedin Ballu cannot avoid lost match.

On 6 December Dhaka Mohammedan meet against Saif Sporting Club and draw 1–1 goals. Goal scored by Saif Sporting Club Nigerian forward Mfon Udoh on 45 minutes and Mohammedan SC defender Rajib Hossain 90+1 minutes goal equalizied scored. Dhaka Mohammedan exist from 2021–22 Independence Cup (Bangladesh) group stage.

On 27 December Dhaka Mohammedan draw 1–1 against Swadhinata KS. On 39 minutes goal by Souleymane Diabate took lead Mohammedan but after a minute goal by Nedo Turković Swadhinata equal score. In the second half both teams were play goalless. To the determined group champion Referee and match commissioner were used penalty shoot out due to Bashundhara Kings withdrawn their name from the tournament. Dhaka Mohammedan won by 4–3 goals penalties shoot out.

January
On 2 January Dhaka Mohammedan won 2–1 goals versus Chittagong Abahani. In the first half both teams players were goalless. In the second half 65 minutes own goal by Chittgong Abahani Arafat Hossen took lead Dhaka Mohammeda. In the 73 minutes Shahriar Emon extended it 2–0 but late goals by Chittagong Abahani Peter Ebimobowei finished the game 2–1.

On 6 January  Dhaka Mohammedan lost 1–2 goals against Rahmatganj MFS in their 1st Semi-finals of Federation Cup. On 5 minutes Rajib Hossain gave lead to Dhaka Mohammedan until end half time. In the second half on 67 minutes Philip Adjah scored for Rahmatganj and level score 1–1 but in the additional time 90+1 minutes Sunday Chizoba secured Final ticket for Rahmatganj MFS.

February
On 5 February Dhaka Mohammedan draw 1–1 goals against Sheikh Russel KC in the home match. On 24 minutes Souleyman Diabate goal took lead Dhaka Mohammedan. Sheikh Russel KC Md Saad Uddin shown red card on 24 minutes due to bad foul. Dhaka Mohammedan finished first half with 1–0 goal. In the second half on 67 minutes Md Masud Rana Dhaka Mohammedan shown red and sent him off and both teams played ten men squad. On 84 minutes Aizar Akmatov goal level the score 1–1 goals both teams finished the game with 1 point each.

On 10 February Dhaka Mohammedan defeated Swadhinata KS by 1–0 goal in the away match. In the first half both team are played excellent and competitive football at the end of first time scoreline were 0–0 goal. In the second half both team started attacking football to take lead and Dhaka Mohammedan got it by Souleymane Diabate on 77 minutes and made it 1–0 scoreline. In the 84 minutes Murad Hasan Swadhinata KS showed red card and sentoff him until end the match Swadhinata KS tried with their ten men's squad to find goal but they won't able avoid loss the game.

On 14 February Dhaka Mohammedan drew 1–1 goals against Chittagong Abahani in the away match. On 28 minutes a goal by Souleymane Diabate took the lead and made scoreline 1–0 before halftime. In the second half between 2 minutes on  47 minutes Kamrul Islam goal leveled the score 1–1 goals. Till ended the both teams has not score any goal and finished the game with a result 1–1 goals.

On 18 February Dhaka Mohammedan defeated Saif Sporting Club by 2–0 in the away match. In the first half on 32 minutes a goal by Souleymane Diabate took the lead Dhaka Mohammedan and hold the lead till end first halftime. In the second half in between 4 minutes a goal by Md Shahriar Emon Dhaka Mohammdan extended the lead  2–0. Rest of the time of second half Saif Sporting Club didn't able to score any goal and Dhaka Mohammdan got three points.

On 23 February Dhaka Mohammedan lost 0–1 goal against Dhaka Abahani at away match. In the first half on 28 minutes Sohel Rana goal took lead Dhaka Abahni and finished halftime with score 1–0. In the second half Dhaka Mohammedan tried to score goal to avoid lost the Dhaka Derby match of the season but they won't able to do it. Dhaka Abahai got victory against their rivery Dhaka Mohammedan 1–0 goal and they got place on top of BPL.

On 28 February Dhaka Mohammedan have drew 1–1 goals against Sheikh Jamal DC in the away match.

March
On 5 March Dhaka Mohammedan lost by 0–2 goals Bashundhara Kings in the away game. In the first half on 11 minutes a goal by Sumon Reza and on 19 minutes Brazilian forward Robson Bashundhara Kings made score 2–0 and they have ended first half with leading score 2–0. In the second half on 47 minutes Anik Hossain Dhaka Mohammedan sent off due to bad gesture and foul. Rest of the game Dhaka Mohammedan haven't able to come back in the match and Bashundhara Kings finished the match with 2–0 win.

On 12 March Dhaka Mohammedan drew by 0–0 goals against Uttar Baridhara Club in the away game. In the first half time and second half time both teams played excellent and competitive football but their players have not found the goal post and end of the game score remains 0–0 both teams share point.

April
On 4 April Dhaka Mohammedan drew versus Bangladesh Police FC with score 0–0 at their home ground.

On 8 April Dhaka Mohammedan got victory by 5–1 goals against Rahmatganj MFS in the away match.

On 25 April Dhaka Mohammedan have drew by 1–1 goals in the away game versus Sheikh Russel KC.

May
On 1 May Dhaka Mohammedan have won against Swadhinata KS by 3–2 at home ground.

On 8 May Dhaka Mohammedan have drew by 3–3 goals against Chittagong Abahani at home venue.

On 12 May Dhaka Mohammedan have lost to Saif Sporting Club by 1–3 goals at home ground.

June
On 22 June Dhaka Mohammedan have lost against Dhaka Abahani by 2–4 goals at home venue.

On 27 June Dhaka Mohammedan have won versus Sheikh Jamal DC the score 3–1 goals at home ground.

July
On 2 July Dhaka Mohammedan have drew versus Bashundhara Kings by 1–1 goals at home stadium.

On 15 July Dhaka Mohammedan have won by 3–0 goals against Uttar Baridhara Club at home ground.

On 21 July Dhaka Mohammedan have lost against Muktijoddha Sangsad  KC 2–1 goals in the away match.

On 27 July Dhaka Mohammedan have drew against Bangladesh Police FC by 1–1 goals in the away match.

August
On 2 August Dhaka Mohammedan have won versus Rahmatganj MFS by 7–0 goals in the home  game.

Current squad
Dhaka Mohammedan squad for 2021–22 season.

Pre-season friendly

Transfer

In

Out

Loans In

Competitions

Overall

Overview

Federation Cup

Group stages

Group A

Knockout stage

Independence Cup

Group stages

Group C

Premier League

League table

Results summary

Results by round

Matches

Statistics

Goalscorers

Source: Matches

References

Bangladeshi football club records and statistics
Mohammedan SC (Dhaka) seasons
2021 in Bangladeshi football
2022 in Bangladeshi football